The mayor of London is the chief executive of the Greater London Authority. The role was created in 2000 after the Greater London devolution referendum in 1998, and was the first directly elected mayor in the United Kingdom.

The current mayor is Sadiq Khan, who took office on 9 May 2016. The position was held by Ken Livingstone from the creation of the role on 4 May 2000 until he was defeated in May 2008 by Boris Johnson, who then also served two terms before being succeeded by Khan.

The mayor is scrutinised by the London Assembly and, supported by their Mayoral Cabinet, directs the entirety of London, including the City of London (for which there is also the Lord Mayor of the City of London). Each London Borough also has a ceremonial mayor or, in Hackney, Lewisham, Newham and Tower Hamlets, an elected mayor.

Background
The Greater London Council, the elected government for Greater London, was abolished in 1986 by the Local Government Act 1985. Strategic functions were split off to various joint arrangements. Londoners voted in a referendum in 1998 to create a new governance structure for Greater London. The directly elected mayor of London was created by the Greater London Authority Act 1999 in 2000 as part of the reforms.

Elections

The mayor is elected by the first-past-the-post system for a fixed term of four years, with elections taking place in May. Prior to the Elections Act 2022, the supplementary vote method was used.

As with most elected posts in the United Kingdom, there is a deposit (in this case of £10,000), which is returnable on the candidate's winning of at least 5% of the first-choice votes cast.

Most recent election

The most recent London mayoral election was held on 6 May 2021, having been delayed from May 2020 due to the COVID-19 pandemic. The results were announced in the evening of 8 May. Sadiq Khan was re-elected for a second term, beating the Conservative Shaun Bailey in the second round.

List of mayors

Timeline
Timeline

Powers and functions
Most powers are derived from the Greater London Authority Act 1999, with additional functions coming from the Greater London Authority Act 2007, the Localism Act 2011 and Police Reform and Social Responsibility Act 2011.

The mayor's main functions are:
Strategic planning, including housing, waste management, the environment and production of the London Plan
Refuse or permit planning permission on strategic grounds
Transport policy, delivered by functional body Transport for London
Fire and emergency planning, delivered by functional body London Fire and Emergency Planning Authority
Policing and crime policy, delivered by functional body Mayor's Office for Policing and Crime (before 2012 by functional body Metropolitan Police Authority). The Metropolitan Police has a structure different to most others across the country, reporting to the Mayor of London instead of a police and crime commissioner.
Economic development, delivered directly by the Greater London Authority through subsidiary company GLA Land and Property (before 2012 by functional body London Development Agency)
Power to create development corporations, such as the London Legacy Development Corporation

The remaining local government functions are performed by the London borough councils. There is some overlap; for example, the borough councils are responsible for waste management, but the mayor is required to produce a waste management strategy. In 2010, Johnson launched an initiative in partnership with the Multi-academy Trust AET to transform schools across London. This led to the establishment of London Academies Enterprise Trust (LAET) which was intended to be a group of ten academies, but it only reached a group of four before the mayor withdrew it in 2013.

The following is a table comparing power over services of the boroughs to the GLA and mayor.

Initiatives

Ken Livingstone
Initiatives taken by Ken Livingstone as Mayor of London included the London congestion charge on private vehicles using city centre London on weekdays, the creation of the London Climate Change Agency, the London Energy Partnership and the founding of the international Large Cities Climate Leadership Group, now known as C40 Cities Climate Leadership Group. The congestion charge led to many new buses being introduced across London. In August 2003, Livingstone oversaw the introduction of the Oyster card electronic ticketing system for Transport for London services. Livingstone supported the withdrawal of the vintage AEC Routemaster buses from regular service in London.

Livingstone introduced the London Partnerships Register which was a voluntary scheme without legal force for same sex couples to register their partnership, and paved the way for the introduction by the United Kingdom Parliament of civil partnerships and later still, Same-sex marriage. Unlike civil partnerships, the London Partnerships Register was open to heterosexual couples who favour a public commitment other than marriage.

As Mayor of London, Ken Livingstone was a supporter of the London Olympics in 2012, ultimately winning the bid to host the Games in 2005. Livingstone encouraged sport in London; especially when sport could be combined with helping charities like The London Marathon and 10K charity races. Livingstone, in a mayoral election debate on the BBC's Question Time in April 2008, stated that the primary reason he supported the Olympic bid was to secure funding for the redevelopment of the East End of London. In July 2007, he brought the Tour de France cycle race to London.

Boris Johnson
In May 2008, Boris Johnson introduced a new transport safety initiative to put 440 high visibility police officers in and around bus stations. A ban on alcohol on underground, and Docklands Light Railway, tram services and stations across the capital was introduced.

Also in May 2008, he announced the closure of The Londoner newspaper, saving approximately £2.9 million. A percentage of this saving was to be spent on planting 10,000 new street trees.

In 2010, he extended the coverage of Oyster card electronic ticketing to all National Rail overground train services. Also in 2010, he opened a cycle hire scheme (originally sponsored by Barclays, now Santander) with 5,000 bicycles available for hire across London. Although initiated by his predecessor, Ken Livingstone, the scheme rapidly acquired the nickname of "Boris Bikes". Johnson withdrew the recently introduced high-speed high-capacity "bendy buses" from service in 2011 which had been bought by Livingstone, and he instead supported the development of the New Routemaster which entered service the next year.

In 2011, Boris Johnson set up the Outer London Fund of £50 million designed to help facilitate improve local high streets. Areas in London were given the chance to submit proposals for two tranches of funding. Successful bids for Phase 1 included Enfield, Muswell Hill and Bexley town centre. The recipients of phase 2 funding were still to be announced .

In January 2013, he appointed journalist Andrew Gilligan as the first Cycling Commissioner for London. In March 2013, Johnson announced £1 billion of investment in infrastructure to make cycling safer in London, including a  East to West segregated 'Crossrail for bikes'.

At the General Election of 7 May 2015, Johnson was elected MP for Uxbridge and Ruislip South, He continued to serve as mayor until the mayoral election in May 2016, when Sadiq Khan was elected.

Sadiq Khan
Sadiq Khan introduced the 'bus hopper' fare on TfL buses, which allows passengers to board a second bus within one hour for the same fare. Under Khan, paper and coin cash transactions became obsolete and the Oyster system was expanded to include debit and credit cards. This initiative was started under his predecessor, Johnson.

Upon election, Khan outlined a vision to make London the "greenest city" by investing in walking and cycling infrastructure while reducing polluting vehicles. In 2019, the "Ultra Low Emission Zone" scheme was launched which taxes highly polluting vehicles in its covered territory. London declared itself the world's first "National Park City" (effective from July 2019), reflecting its unusually high amount of green space for a city of its size.

Extended term
The Government postponed all elections due in May 2020, including for the mayor of London, for one year due to the COVID-19 pandemic. Khan had therefore served a term in office of five years rather than four, which ended in May 2021. He was re-elected in 2021 for a further four-year term, defeating the Conservative candidate Shaun Bailey.

See also

Foreign relations of the Mayor of London
Leaders of the Greater London Council

Notes

References

External links 
Page about the process of nomination 

 
Local government in London
London
2000 establishments in England